Oryza nivara is a wild progenitor of the cultivated rice Oryza sativa. It is found growing in swampy areas, at edge of pond and tanks, beside streams, in ditches, in or around rice fields. Grows in shallow water up to 0.3 m, in seasonally dry and open habitats.

It is an annual, short to intermediate height (usually <2 m) grass; panicles usually compact, rarely open; spikelets large, 6–10.4 mm long and 1.9-3.4 mm wide, with strong awn (4–10 cm long); anthers 1.5–3 mm long.

Its distribution includes Bangladesh, Cambodia, China, India, Laos, Malaysia, Myanmar, Nepal, Sri Lanka, Thailand, and Vietnam.

Recently, the genome of O. nivara was sequenced.

References

nivara
Flora of tropical Asia